Bold as Brass is a studio album by Cliff Richard, of songs from the Great American Songbook. It reached No. 3 on the UK Albums Charts.

The album features classic songs written by the like of George Gershwin, Richard Rodgers, Lorenz Hart and Cole Porter.

Following his sold-out concerts around the world in 2009/10, he performed a series of six sold-out shows at London's Royal Albert Hall. Both the concerts and album received positive critical reviews and commercial success. A DVD was released of Bold as Brass, as well as a specially pressed limited edition bonus package.

Track listing

Chart positions

Concerts

The six concerts accompanying the release of Bold as Brass centred on Richard's 70th birthday, on 14 October 2010. To celebrate this, Richard was accompanied by a swing band to perform tracks from his album of swing songs, as well as distinguished classics from his 52-year career. Performed at the Royal Albert Hall, London, where he holds the record for playing the most sold-out shows in one run (32), the concerts took over £2m at the box office.

Tour dates

Tour statistics

References

2010 albums
Cliff Richard albums